Scott Speer (born June 5, 1982) is an American filmmaker, music video director, television director and novelist.

Life and career
Speer was born in San Diego, California. At age 23, he was signed with HSI Productions, and in 2006 Speer received the MVPA Award for Directorial Debut of the Year for the music video of "Stars" by Switchfoot.

In 2007 he won his first MTV Video Music Awards Latin America in México, for his work with "Bella Traicion" by the Mexican pop sensation Belinda. In June 2007, he directed a three-part video series for Ashley Tisdale. These videos included "He Said She Said", "Not Like That" and "Suddenly" released on her DVD There's Something About Ashley. In 2009, he again directed music videos for Tisdale for "It's Alright, It's OK" and "Crank It Up" from her album Guilty Pleasure. He also had an on-and-off relationship with Tisdale from 2009–2012.

In addition to directing, Speer produced and second unit directed the feature film The Beat, an official selection of the 2003 Sundance Film Festival, and remains deeply involved in independent films. In 2010 Scott directed The LXD episode "Duet".

In 2012, he directed Step Up Revolution (2012), his feature film directing debut.

In April 2012, Speer released a young adult novel called Immortal City, about a world in which celebrity culture revolves around supernatural beings, specifically guardian angels.

In April 2013, Speer released a book called Natural Born Angel. He also wrote the preceding novel Immortal City (2012) and concluded the trilogy with Battle Angel in 2014. In 2015 he filmed the highly rated exorcism short film Realm, which was also later made into a full-length film.

Filmography

Music videos

2005
Switchfoot - "Stars"

2006
Five Speed - "The Mess"
Teddy Geiger - "For You I Will (Confidence)"
Eric Church - "How 'Bout You"
Sanctus Real - "I'm Not Alright"
Paris Hilton - "Nothing In This World"
Belinda - "Ni Freud, Ni Tu Mamá"

2007
Eric Church - "Guys Like Me"
Belinda - "Bella Traición"
Belinda - "Luz Sin Gravedad" (co-directed with Belinda)
Ashley Tisdale - "He Said She Said"
Ashley Tisdale - "Suddenly"
Ashley Tisdale - "Not Like That"
The Veronicas - "Hook Me Up"
Belinda - "If We Were"
Aly & AJ - "Like Whoa"
Brandi Carlile - "The Story"
Erika Jayne - "Stars"

2008
Alexander Kogan - "I Will"
Belinda - "See a Little Light"
Luigi Masi - "The Look"
Big Boi featuring Andre 3000 and Raekwon - "Royal Flush"
Clique Girlz - "Then I Woke Up"
Jordin Sparks - "Tattoo" (Second version)
Paula Abdul - "Dance Like There's No Tomorrow" (co-directed with Abdul)
David Archuleta - "A Little Too Not Over You"
Blake Shelton - "She Wouldn't Be Gone"

2009
Jessica Harp - "Boy Like Me"
Ashley Tisdale - "It's Alright, It's OK"
V Factory - "Love Struck"
Ashley Tisdale - "Crank It Up"
Parachute - "Under Control"

2010
Charice featuring Iyaz - "Pyramid"
Jason Derulo - "Ridin' Solo"
Orianthi - "Courage"

Feature films
 The Beat (2003) (producer, second unit director)
 Step Up Revolution (2012) (director)
 Step Up: All In (2014) (executive producer)
 Midnight Sun (2018) (director)
 Status Update (2018) (director)
 I Still See You (2018) (director)
 Endless (2020) (director)

Television
 Finding Carter (2014) (director)
 Scream (2016) (director)

Awards and nominations

Bibliography
 2012: Immortal City
 2013: Natural Born Angel
 2014: Battle Angel

References

External links

1982 births
Living people
21st-century American novelists
American music video directors
American television directors
American young adult novelists
Film directors from California
Writers from San Diego